The 1934–35 Elitserien season was the eighth and final season of the Elitserien, the top level ice hockey league in Sweden. It was replaced by the Svenska Serien for 1935-36. Hammarby IF won the Elitserien title for the third consecutive year.

Final standings

External links
 1934-35 season

Elitserien (1927–1935) seasons
1934–35 in Swedish ice hockey
Sweden